Yan Xing or Yanxing may refer to:

People
 Yan Xing (Han dynasty) ( 209–211), military general under the warlord Han Sui
 Yan Xing (artist) (born 1986), Chinese artist

Historical eras
Yanxing (炎興, 263), era name used by Liu Shan, emperor of Shu Han
Yanxing (燕興, 384), era name used by Murong Hong, founder of Western Yan
Yanxing (延興, 471–476), era name used by Emperor Xiaowen of Northern Wei
Yanxing (延興, 494), era name used by Xiao Zhaowen, emperor of Southern Qi